Ocimum gratissimum, also known as clove basil, African basil, and in Hawaii as wild basil, is a species of basil. It is native to Africa, Madagascar, southern Asia, and the Bismarck Archipelago, and naturalized in Polynesia, Hawaii, Mexico, Panama, West Indies, Brazil, and Bolivia.

Other names 
O. gratissimum is a common culinary herb in West Africa and is used by some in the Caribbean, going by many local names.

Ebe-amwonkho in Edo
Tchayo in Fon
Dogosui in Ewe
Efirin in Yoruba
Tamwṍtswã́gi in Nupe
Nchanwu in Igbo
Kpan-sroh in (Irigwe language)
Añyeba in Igala
Daidoya in Hausa
Nchuanwu also Arimu in Igbo
Ntong in Ibibio, Efik
Kunudiri  in Kirikeni Okuein
Nunum in Akan
Nunu Bush in Jamaica (from the Akan language)
Yerba di holé in Papiamento
Fobazen in Haiti
Scent leaves in Nigeria and in the African diaspora
Mujaaja in Uganda
Maduruthala in Sri Lanka මදුරුතලා
Kattutulasi(കാട്ടുതുളസി),  Kattu Thrithaav (കാട്ടു തൃത്താവ്) in Kerala
Bai yeera in Thai ใบยี่หร่า
Rehani in Georgian რეჰანი
Van Tulsi in Gujarati
Tomka leaf (তোমকা/তোমহা পাতা) in chittagoneon Bangla
Awromangnrin in Baoulé
'Kungurekwu u tamen in Tiv
Nchuanwu in Igbo language
ደማከሴ (Demakese) in Ethiopia

Seed germination
Seeds seem to need strong sunlight to germinate, although germination has been achieved even during an average UK summer.

Phytochemical compounds 
The phytochemicals present in Ocimum gratissimum  contains polyphenols such as Gallic acid, Rosmanol, rosmarinic acid, flavonoids such as Nepetrin, Quercetin, Rutin,

Catechin, and also alkaloids and terpenoids. Naringin, uteolin, Apigenin, Nepetoidin, Nevadensin, Hymenoxin,  Salvigenin, Apigenin, 7,4,′-dimethyl ether,  Basilimoside,  2alpha, 3 beta-Dihydroxyolean- 12en-28-oic acid, Methyl acetate, Oleanolic acid

Pharmacology of extracts and essential oils
The essential oil of Ocimum gratissimum contains eugenol and shows some evidence of antibacterial activity. The essential oil has potential for use as a food preservative, and is toxic to Leishmania.

Insect repellent
O. gratissimum repels the thrips Thrips tabaci, and so is a useful insect repellent in other crops.

References

External links
 

Herbs
gratissimum
Medicinal plants
Plants described in 1753
Flora of Africa
Flora of Madagascar
Flora of Asia
Taxa named by Carl Linnaeus